is a Japanese female volleyball player. She was part of the Japan women's national volleyball team.

She participated in the 2013 FIVB Volleyball World Grand Prix.
On club level she played for Hisamitsu Seiyaku Springs in 2013.

References

External links
 Profile at FIVB.org

1992 births
Living people
Japanese women's volleyball players
Place of birth missing (living people)